Compete.com was a web traffic analysis service. The company was founded in 2000 and ceased operations in December 2016.

Services
Compete.com provided two categories of information: 
Site Analytics
 a free service, where the user can enter any domain name and receive unique visitors and Compete Rank for the entered site. 
Search Analytics
 a paid service that shows the user which keywords are sending traffic to the user's website and its competitors.

Compete Toolbar
The Compete Toolbar allowed users to view the Compete Trust Scores and the US Internet ranks of websites they visit.  This was done by sending the URLs that users visit to Compete.com.  Compete.com then sent back the trust scores and internet ranks from its database to the users.

Additionally, users of the Compete Toolbar had the option of participating in Community Share.  By participating in Community Share, users were assigned a user number, and that number will be submitted along with the URLs of the websites that these users visit.  This information was used to roughly determine how many users visit each website.

Although no personally identifiable information was submitted to Compete.com, the server received the originating IP address.

History
Compete.com was launched in 2000 by Bill Gross, an entrepreneur who started the search engine GoTo.com (later Overture). In March 2008, London market research company TNS purchased Compete.com for $150 million. The Compete.com service ceased activity on December 31, 2016.

See also
 Alexa.com
 Quantcast.com

References

External links
(now closed)

American companies established in 2000
Companies based in Atlanta
Research and analysis firms of the United States
Market research companies of the United States
Defunct online companies of the United States
Internet properties established in 2000
Digital marketing companies of the United States
Defunct research and analysis firms
Internet properties disestablished in 2016
Companies disestablished in 2016
2016 disestablishments in Georgia (U.S. state)
Privately held companies based in Georgia (U.S. state)